Euphaedra dargei is a butterfly in the family Nymphalidae. It is found in Cameroon.

References

Butterflies described in 1975
dargei
Endemic fauna of Cameroon
Butterflies of Africa